Saxophone Improvisations Series F is a solo album by American saxophonist and composer Anthony Braxton recorded in 1972 and originally released on the French America label.

Reception
The Allmusic review by Eugene Chadbourne awarded the album 4 stars stating "although the early recordings of Braxton seem to be marked by frustration and failure, this is a suitable follow-up to For Alto as well as an improvement, a great accomplishment in itself".

Track listing
All compositions by Anthony Braxton.

Disc one 
 "BWC-12 N-48" - 5:00 
 "Nr-12-C (33M)" - 9:09 
 "Rfo-M° F (32)" - 6:54 
 "JMK-80 CFN-7" - 17:57 
Disc two 
 "178-F4 312" - 2:20 
 "NBH-7C K7" - 5:26 
 "MMKF-6 (CN-72)" - 6:59 
 "(348-R) C-233" - 7:23 
 "104°-Kelvin M-12" - 19:01

Personnel
Anthony Braxton – alto saxophone

References

America Records albums
Anthony Braxton albums
1972 albums